Efforts to teach writing in primary and secondary schools in the United States at a national scale and using methods other than direct teacher-student tutorial were first implemented in the 19th century. The positive association between students' development of the ability to use writing to refine and synthesize their thinking and their performance in other disciplines is well-documented.  

A review of evidence-based practice studies emphasizes that instruction in writing should include: substantial and varied kinds of writing with supportive feedback, explicit teaching of skills and strategies, contemporary composing technologies, and opportunities to use writing as a means to develop knowledge of content. Another meta-analysis has confirmed that these benefits extend beyond English Language Arts classrooms and across the disciplines, finding evidence that science, social studies, and mathematics teachers who use writing-to-learn strategies can "reasonably expect" gains in "students' comprehension and application of content knowledge." Teachers' own professional preparation to teach writing, their personal beliefs about writing, and local and national policies regarding curriculum and instruction have been shown to influence how students learn and develop as writers.

Writing instruction in primary and secondary schools through mid-twentieth century 

Early academic instruction in writing tended to center on mechanics, commonly referred to today as conventions. Emphasis was placed on handwriting, grammar, punctuation and spelling. Papers were more likely to be graded on conformity to these conventions and accuracy of content than on style or creative expression of ideas. This focus on surface conventions has been traced to the exceptional workload of US instructors during the end of the nineteenth century, who -- since these conventions are easier to assess than quality of ideas -- used it as a coping strategy to deal with the volume of themes they were expected to grade weekly. Nonetheless, Lucille Schultz has documented a number of methods of teaching writing dating back to the mid-nineteenth century that drew on children's experience and expressive motivation.

Writing process approach 
Research conducted in the late 1970s by Donald Graves, Janet Emig, and others led to a focus on the process, rather than solely the product, of writing. The writing process approach rests on the premise that writing is a complex and individualized task which can be described through a series of recursive stages. These stages, hypothesized at the time to involve separate stages of pre-writing, writing, and rewriting (or revision) were modeled and taught to students, on the assumption that students' difficulties in each stage could be diagnosed more accurately. The National Writing Project was influential in spreading these ideas from higher education throughout all levels of schooling. 

Students can also choose to work together in a process known as collaborative writing. 

Darolyn Jones, author of Collaborative Writing: Priority, Practice and Process, says that many people work alone for several reasons. The first one is that many people cannot find time to meet with the rest of the group. Another reason is that each writer has their organization and own process of writing. When students work with others, they must adjust to the style of the group and get rid of their own. Many times there is a misunderstanding of what is expected of the students. The last reason is the fear of being criticized. Many writers do not feel comfortable sharing their work because they are afraid it will be disliked by their readers.

Writing across the curriculum 

During the 1980s and 1990s, new approaches to teaching writing emerged, as teachers realized that in order to be effective, a piece of writing should be tailored to a specific purpose and audience. Prominent among these was the British-based movement which came to be known as writing across the curriculum. This approach rests on the premise that all teachers, not just language arts teachers, must be teachers of writing. Designed to ease the separation between literacy and content knowledge, this approach emphasizes the connection between writing and cognitive development, teaching students to write in a variety of genres, specific to purpose and discipline. Writing Across the Curriculum teachers often emphasize two basic pedagogical strands:  Writing to Learn, informal writing done to prompt students to more deeply understand concepts; and Writing in the Disciplines, in which students are taught writing skills and conventions necessary to participate in specific academic discourse.

Writing for understanding 

Writing for understanding, a 21st-century approach, adapts the principles of backward design to teach students to write effectively. Writing for understanding grew out of a recognition that most students require explicit instruction in both the knowledge and the structures that they need to construct meaning in writing. Oral processing and the extensive use of models and modeling are core teaching methodologies in this approach. Writing for understanding rests on three pillars: backward design, understanding, and direct instruction.  Students are given focused, intentional instruction and practice in:

 developing a knowledge and understanding which can be articulated in spoken and written language
 identifying an appropriate focus for thinking about and synthesizing that knowledge and understanding
 choosing a structure through which to clearly develop and present that knowledge and understanding
 establishing control over conventions.

Writing for understanding teachers design their instructions so students can generalize and transfer their skills to appropriate contexts. The Vermont Writing Collaborative serves as a clearinghouse for information about Writing for Understanding and provides professional development, instructional materials and support for educators.

The reading and apprenticeship connections 
According to some writing theorists, reading for pleasure provides a more effective way of mastering the art of writing than does a formal study of writing, language, grammar, and vocabulary."Studies that sought to improve writing by providing reading experiences in place of grammar study or additional writing practice found that these experiences were as beneficial as, or more beneficial than, grammar study or extra writing practice."The apprenticeship approach provides one variant of the reading connection, arguing that the composition classroom should resemble pottery or piano workshops—minimizing dependence on excessive self-reflection, preoccupation with audience, and explicit rules.  By watching the master, according to Michael Polanyi, an “apprentice unconsciously picks up the rules of the art, including those which are not explicitly known to the master himself.”  Writing instructors, according to this approach, serve as models and coaches, providing explicit feedback in response to the learner's compositions. Students focus their attention on the task at hand, and not on "an inaccessible and confusing multitude of explicit rules and strategies."

2009–present 
Partially in response to the National Commission on Writing's challenge to American public educators "to teach all students to write effectively, clearly and thoughtfully," the National Governors Association Center for Best Practices (NGA Center) and the Council of Chief State School Officers (CCSSO) assumed in 2009 the coordination of a state-led effort called The Common Core State Standards Initiative.  In this initiative, "Governors and state commissioners of education from 48 states, 2 territories and the District of Columbia committed to developing a common core of state standards in English-language arts." The Common Core State Standards Initiative's focus, with regard to writing, is to prepare America's students for college and career writing. Standards have been organized around the following categories: Text Types and Purposes; Production and Distribution of Writing; Research to Build and Present Knowledge; and Range of Writing. These main categories are divided into ten concepts and skills which are introduced to students in Kindergarten and then built upon in subsequent grade levels, with the intention that complexity and rigor increase each year to facilitate development and mastery.

See also
 Education in the United States
 Four square writing method
 Literacy in the United States

References

External links 
 Literacy: Writing and Composition
 National Writing Project
 Vermont Writing Collaborative
 Common Core State Standards Initiative

Writing
Pedagogy
Education in the United States by subject